Fayez is an Arabic given name for males, a variant of Faiz. People named Fayez include:

 Fayez Bandar, Kuwaiti footballer
 Fayez Banihammad, one of the hijackers in the September 11 attacks
 Fayez Ghosn, Lebanese politician
 Fayez Sarofim, Coptic Egyptian American fund manager
 Fayez al-Tarawneh, former Prime Minister of Jordan

Arabic masculine given names